Frédéric Mistral (1893–1968) was a French lawyer and linguist. He was a practising lawyer in Avignon. He served as the capouliér (president) of the Félibrige from 1941 to 1956. He promoted Provençal language and literature in France and abroad.

Works

References

1893 births
1968 deaths
People from Avignon
20th-century French lawyers
French non-fiction writers
20th-century non-fiction writers